Fog in August is a 2016 German drama film directed by Kai Wessel. It is based on the 2008 novel Fog in August by Robert Domes, and is inspired by the documented true story of the 14 year old Yenish boy Ernst Lossa (1929–1944). It was listed as one of eight films that could be the German submission for the Best Foreign Language Film at the 89th Academy Awards, but it was not selected.

Plot
In Nazi Germany in 1944, Yenish boy named Ernst Lossa is transferred to a mental institution, where he labors under the watch of Dr. Veithausen. Ernst, initially identified as a troublemaker, lives up to his role and frequently rebels in minor ways. He does not plan to stay in the institution long, but expects to be taken home (and eventually to America) by his father, Christian Lossa, but is denied discharge based on the fact that his father has no permanent address after being released from a concentration camp.

Initially, certain patients in the hospital are marked to be sent to the Hadamar Killing Facility to be murdered, but central authorities dictate that the 'euthanasia' operation and decisions be transferred to individual institutions, leaving Dr. Veithausen to direct his nurses to kill patients under their care. The newly hired nurse, Sister Kiefer, has transferred from Hadamar and is willing to exterminate child patients using barbiturates. Meanwhile Sister Sophia tries to protect the children from being poisoned.

Ernst befriends Nandl, a fellow patient, and over time they become aware of Dr. Veithausen's plans to murder the patients in the institution.  He attempts to work out an escape plan to save Nandl and himself. The doctor, following the logic of racial hygiene, devises a plan to starve patients slowly by feeding them boiled vegetable soup with all nutrients removed, which satisfies his Nazi superiors. Not long after, Ernst plans his escape during an air raid, but he fails when a bomb drops nearby and the falling debris injures Nandl and kills Sister Sophia. After the nurse's funeral, Ernst accuses Veithausen of being a murderer.

Dr. Veithausen calls for Ernst's death, which is carried out by either Paul Hechtle or Sister Kiefer (both deny being the killer). Nandl breaks the news to the other patients by claiming that Ernst has finally made it to America.

Cast
 Ivo Pietzcker as Ernst Lossa
 Sebastian Koch as Dr. Werner Veithausen
 Thomas Schubert as Paul Hechtle
 Fritzi Haberlandt as Sister Oberschwester Sophia
 Henriette Confurius Sister Edith Kiefer
 Karl Markovics as Christian Lossa
 Branko Samarovski as Max Witt
 David Bennent as Oja
 Franziska Singer as Frau Klein
 Juls Serger as Hermann Klein
 Jule Hermann as Nandl

References

External links
 

2016 films
2016 drama films
2016 war drama films
2010s German-language films
German war drama films
Films about euthanasia
Films scored by Martin Todsharow
Films about Nazi Germany
Films set in hospitals
2010s German films